The 2003 Volta a la Comunitat Valenciana was the 61st edition of the Volta a la Comunitat Valenciana road cycling stage race, which was held from 25 February to 1 March 2003. The race started in San Vicente del Raspeig and finished in Valencia. The race was won by Dario Frigo of the  team.

General classification

References

2003
Volta a la Comunitat Valenciana